Keerimalai  ( kīrimalai) is a town in Jaffna District, Sri Lanka.  Naguleswaram temple is located in this suburb also a mineral water spring called Keerimalai Springs reputed for its curative properties. In Tamil Keerimalai means Mongoose-Hill, see Naguleswaram temple. Keerimalai is situated from 25 km north to Jaffna.

Gallery

See also
Casuarina Beach 
Kantharodai
Nallur (Jaffna)
Naguleswaram temple
Nallur Kandaswamy Kovil
Nainativu
Neduntheevu
Nilavarai
Idikundu
Hinduism in Sri Lanka

References 

Towns in Jaffna District
Valikamam North DS Division